Randvere is a village in Viimsi Parish, Harju County in northern Estonia. As of 2011 Census, the settlement's population was 1,690.

Randvere was first mentioned in 1397. During the Middle Ages Randvere was settled by Coastal Swedes and belonged under the Maardu Manor (located in Maardu village). 1848–1852 Randvere Lutheran Church was built.

Famous Estonian minstrel Mari Kilu (1853–1947; :et) was born and lived in Randvere.

Randvere is connected to the centre of Tallinn by Tallinn Bus Company's route nr. 38 (Viru keskus – Muuga), average traveling time is about 30 minutes.

References

External links
Official website 
Randvere blog 
Randvere Lutheran Church 
Randvere youth centre 
Randvere Kindergarten 
Randvere general practitioner 

Villages in Harju County